Andrew S. Fields (born January 10, 1957) is an American former professional basketball player and coach. As a player, he led Cheyney State to the 1978 NCAA Division II championship, where he was named playoff MVP. His success led him to be drafted with the 18th pick of the second round of the 1979 NBA draft by the Portland Trail Blazers. He however failed to land a contract when Blazers management decided to sign just one player.

A resident of Atlantic City, New Jersey, Fields graduated from Atlantic City High School in 1975.

He played overseas, earning playing contracts in Belgium, the Netherlands, France, Switzerland, and most notably in the Philippines for Toyota in the Philippine Basketball Association (PBA).

In the Philippines, Fields was among the best defensive and rebounding imports in PBA history, with a career average of 15.5 rebounds per game. He was an adept shotblocker, feared by local players and fellow imports.  During his stint with Toyota, he sparked the team's dreaded fastbreak either with a shotblock swatted to the direction of a streaking teammate on the wings or a sharp outlet pass which he threw like an American football forward pass to a teammate at the other end, usually  Francis Arnaiz or Arnie Tuadles.  He was part of the 1981 Toyota team that won the Open Conference championship over arch-rival Crispa Redmanizers, playing alongside fellow import Victor King. In that same conference he won the PBA's Best Import of the Conference Award. The following year, he teamed up with Donnie Ray Koonce to lead Toyota to the 1982 Open Conference title.

On August 19, 2011, Fields was named the Head Men's Basketball Coach at Atlantic Cape Community College.  In his first season, he led Atlantic Cape to a 16–15 record and their first Region XIX Final Four appearance in 20 years. In February 2015, Fields was replaced by Marvin Graham as coach after becoming unable to return to coaching due to a car accident in January.

References

Living people
African-American basketball players
American expatriate basketball people in Belgium
American expatriate basketball people in France
American expatriate basketball people in Switzerland
American expatriate basketball people in the Netherlands
American expatriate basketball people in the Philippines
American men's basketball players
Atlantic City High School alumni
Basketball players from New Jersey
Centers (basketball)
Cheyney Wolves men's basketball players
Philippine Basketball Association imports
Portland Trail Blazers draft picks
Power forwards (basketball)
Sportspeople from Atlantic City, New Jersey
Toyota Super Corollas players
1957 births
21st-century African-American people
20th-century African-American sportspeople